The Ruit Bonjol commemorates the conquest of the fortress Bonjol in the former Dutch East Indies in 1837 after the prolonged Padri War against Tuanku Imam Bonjol and his followers.

Sources 
 P.J.d'Artillac Brill Sr., "Beknopte geschiedenis der Nederlandse Ridderorden", 1951
 H.G. Meijer, C.P. Mulder en B.W. Wagenaar, "Orders and Decorations of The Netherlands",1984
 J.A. van Zelm van Eldik, Moed en Eer, 2003

External links
 Lijst van gedecoreerden

Military awards and decorations of the Netherlands
Dutch East Indies
History of Sumatra